St Mark's, Teddington, the parish church  of South Teddington and Hampton Wick, is a Church of England church in the liberal Catholic tradition. It is located on St Mark's Road, Teddington in the London Borough of Richmond upon Thames. The current building dates from 1939 and was designed by architect Cyril Farey.

References

External links

Official website
A Church Near You: St Mark Teddington, Teddington

Teddington
Diocese of London
History of the London Borough of Richmond upon Thames
Churches in Teddington